The 1949–50 season was Blackpool F.C.'s 42nd season (39th consecutive) in the Football League. They competed in the 22-team Division One, then the top tier of English football, finishing seventh.

Stan Mortensen was the club's top scorer for the sixth consecutive season, with 25 goals (22 in the league and three in the FA Cup).

Table

Notes

References

Blackpool F.C.
Blackpool F.C. seasons